DCRA may refer to:

Dane County Regional Airport
District of Columbia Department of Consumer and Regulatory Affairs
Dominion of Canada Rifle Association
Decisional composite residuosity assumption